Broken Sword Creek in Wyandot County and Crawford County, Ohio is a  tributary of the Sandusky River.

Legend states the name is derived from an incident when William Crawford broke his sword at the creek bank in order to render it useless to Native Americans who were pursuing him.

Tributaries
Brandywine Creek (Broken Sword Creek)

See also
List of rivers of Ohio

References

Rivers of Ohio
Rivers of Crawford County, Ohio
Rivers of Wyandot County, Ohio
Sandusky River